Burasaia is a genus of flowering plants belonging to the family Menispermaceae.

Its native range is Madagascar.

Species:

Burasaia australis 
Burasaia congesta 
Burasaia gracilis 
Burasaia madagascariensis

References

Menispermaceae
Menispermaceae genera